Patricia Ann Jacobs OBE FRSE FRS FMedSci FRCPath (born 8 October 1934) is a Scottish geneticist and is Honorary Professor of Human Genetics, Co-director of Research, Wessex Regional Genetics Laboratory, within the University of Southampton.

Early life and education
Jacobs was born on 8 October 1934 to Sadie (née Jones) and Cyril Jacobs. She attended the University of St Andrews, graduating in 1956 with a BSc with first class honours in zoology.

She was cited by professor Bryan Sykes in Adam's Curse: A Future Without Men.

Career and research 
In 1959, five days after Jérôme Lejeune described the trisomy-21  in Down syndrome, basing himself off Marthe Gautier's work, Jacobs and John Strong described an additional X chromosome in male patients (the 47,XXY karyotype) also known as Klinefelter syndrome, as Harry Klinefelter had already diagnosed the symptoms in 1942. Despite her work being on XXY syndrome, the XYY syndrome is instead sometimes called Jacobs syndrome: After it had been incidentally discovered by Avery Sandberg in 1961, the syndrome was also found in a chromosome survey of 315 men at a hospital for developmentally disabled, made by Jacobs and hence considered the first little research on it. However, that selection had been too little for a meaningful result, so that individuals of this syndrome were mischaracterised as aggressive and violent criminals, which led the path for many biased studies on height-selected, institutionalised XYY individuals in the following decades.

Awards and honours
Jacobs has received many awards in recognition of her work, including the 1999 Mauro Baschirotto Award of the European Society of Human Genetics and the 2011 March of Dimes Prize in Developmental Biology. Her services to genetics saw her named an OBE in 1999. Jacobs was elected as a Foreign Associate of the US National Academy of Sciences in 2010.

In 1981, she received the William Allan Memorial Award from the American Society of Human Genetics. In 1993, she was elected a Fellow of the Royal Society. She was the first recipient of the KS&A Patricia Jacobs Lifetime Achievement Award from the US charity Knowledge Support & Action. In February 2010, Jacobs was elected as a member of the United States National Academy of Sciences, the induction ceremony took place in April. In 2011, Jacobs received the March of Dimes Prize in Developmental Biology.

Personal life 
In 1972 she married Newton Morton. She has two step-daughters and three step-sons.

References

External links 
 

1934 births
Living people
Scottish geneticists
Female Fellows of the Royal Society
Fellows of the Royal Society
Fellows of the American Statistical Association
Place of birth missing (living people)
Foreign associates of the National Academy of Sciences
Officers of the Order of the British Empire
Alumni of the University of St Andrews
Academics of the University of Southampton
Fellows of the Royal Society of Edinburgh
Human geneticists
Fellows of the Royal College of Physicians of Edinburgh
Academics of the University of Edinburgh
Scottish women scientists
Wellcome Trust Principal Research Fellows
Scottish women academics